Helen Bina (May 19, 1912 – March 15, 1983) was an American speed skater who competed in the 1932 Winter Olympics.

She competed at the women's speed skating events at the 1932 Winter Olympics which were held as demonstration sport. She finished third in the 1500 metres event and sixth in the 500 metres competition. She also participated in the 1000 metres event but was eliminated in the heats. In the unofficial 1933 World Allround Speed Skating Championships for Women in Oslo she finished third.

External links
 
 Official Olympic Report 1932
 Helen Bina's obituary

1912 births
1983 deaths
Olympic speed skaters of the United States
Speed skaters at the 1932 Winter Olympics
American female speed skaters
World Allround Speed Skating Championships medalists
20th-century American women
20th-century American people